

François Magendie (6 October 1783 – 7 October 1855) was a French physiologist, considered a pioneer of experimental physiology.  He is known for describing the foramen of Magendie.  There is also a Magendie sign, a downward and inward rotation of the eye due to a lesion in the cerebellum. Magendie was a faculty at the College of France, holding the Chair of Medicine from 1830 to 1855 (he was succeeded by Claude Bernard, who worked previously as his assistant).

In 1816 he published Précis élementaire de Physiologie which described an experiment first illustrating the concept of empty calories:
I took a dog of three years old, fat, and in good health, and put it to feed upon sugar alone...It expired the 32nd day of the experiment.

His most important contribution to science was also his most disputed.  Contemporaneous to Sir Charles Bell, Magendie conducted a number of experiments on the nervous system, in particular verifying the differentiation between sensory and motor nerves in the spinal cord, the so-called Bell–Magendie law.  This led to an intense rivalry, with the British claiming that Bell published his discoveries first and that Magendie stole his experiments.  The intensity of this scientific rivalry perhaps can only be compared to that between Isaac Newton and Robert Hooke.

Magendie was also a notorious vivisector, shocking even many of his contemporaries with the live dissections that he performed at public lectures in physiology. Richard Martin, an Irish MP, in introducing his famous bill banning animal cruelty in the United Kingdom, described Magendie's public dissection of a greyhound, in which the beast was nailed down ear and paw, half the nerves of its face dissected then left overnight for further dissection, calling Magendie a "disgrace to Society." There was a belief among British physicians, even those who defended animal experimentation, that Magendie purposely subjected his experimental animals to needless torture. A Quaker once visited him, questioning him about vivisection; according to Anne Fagot-Largeault's inaugural lesson at the College of France, he responded with much patience, argumenting the reasons of animal experimentation. Besides drawing sharp criticism from contemporaries in both Britain and France, Magendie's methods were later criticized by, among others, Charles Darwin and Thomas Henry Huxley.

Colin White credits to Magendie the earliest version of the phrase "Lies, damned lies, and statistics". While arguing against using blood-letting to treat fever, and confronted with statistical numbers he believed to be manufactured, Magendie stated: "Thus the alteration of the truth which is already manifesting itself in the progressive form of lying and perjury, offers us, in the superlative, the statistics."

Works 
 Vorschriften für die Bereitung und Anwendung einiger neuen Arzneimittel als der Krähenaugen, des Morphins, der Blausäure ... der Jodine u. m. a. : a. d. Franz . Leop. Voß, Leipzig 1822 Digital edition / 1823 Digital edition / 1831 Digital edition by the University and State Library Düsseldorf
 Formulary for the preparation and mode of employing several new remedies . (2 volumes) Underwood, London 1824. Digital edition by the University and State Library Düsseldorf 
 A Formulary for the Preparation and medical : administration of certain new Remedies / François Magendie. Transl. from the French of M. Magendie, with Annotations and additional Articles by James Manby Gully . Churchill, London 1835.  Digital edition by the University and State Library Düsseldorf

Footnotes

References
Biography from the French Ministry of Culture
Leffingwell, Albert. An Ethical Problem.
Gray's Psychology
 Short biography and bibliography in the Virtual Laboratory of the Max Planck Institute for the History of Science

External links
 

1783 births
1855 deaths
Academic staff of the Collège de France
French physiologists
Members of the French Academy of Sciences
Members of the Royal Swedish Academy of Sciences